The mini-humbucker is a humbucking guitar pickup (used in electric guitars). It was originally created by the Epiphone company. The mini-humbucker resembles a Gibson PAF humbucker, but is narrower in size and senses a shorter length of string vibration. This produces clearer, brighter tones that are quite unlike typical Gibson sounds. It fits in between single-coils and full-sized humbuckers in the tonal spectrum. It is frequently used in jazz guitars, mounted under the fingerboard or on the pickguard.

The mini-humbucker technology was acquired by Gibson when they purchased Epiphone in the late 1950s. After this acquisition, Gibson began using mini-humbuckers in various guitar models. They continued to use them on many Epiphone electric guitars (now manufactured under license for Gibson) and several of Gibson's archtop jazz guitars. A slightly different variation of the mini-humbuckers was used on Gibson Firebird guitars, thus giving them a very distinctive tone.

The Firebird pickup uses a pair of long 'rail' magnets whereas the Les Paul Deluxe mini-humbucker uses a single bar magnet below one ferrous rail and six threaded ferrous pole pieces.  The Deluxe mini-humbucker has adjustment screws for the pole pieces; the Firebird mini-humbucker does not.

In the 1970s, mini-humbuckers replaced Gibson's original P-90 single-coil pickups on several of Gibson's budget guitar models, as well as the Les Paul Deluxe: the size and shape meant that it could fit very comfortably into the space occupied by the P-90, so no extra routing was required in the solid body guitars. Only select re-issue Gibson models are still made with Mini-humbuckers, as they are less popular than standard humbuckers. In 2011, Gibson released a '70s Tribute line of guitars, offering inexpensive mini-humbucker variants of the Les Paul Studio, Firebird, and SG Special; these use the Firebird style of mini-humbucker pickup. Mini-humbuckers were also used in some models of the Nighthawk.

A mini-humbucker pickup design is also used for the pickups in Rickenbacker 650 guitars and 4004 basses.

A number of third party manufacturers make mini-humbucker replacement pickups. As of 2018, EMG, Seymour Duncan, DiMarzio, GFS, Dragonfire, and Jason Lollar all make mini-humbuckers.

Notable users
 Johnny Winter used an Epiphone Wilshire equipped with mini-humbuckers early in his career. 
 Pete Townshend of The Who used a number of Gibson Les Paul Deluxe guitars in the 1970s that featured the mini-humbucker.
 Scott Gorham (Thin Lizzy) and Barry Bailey (Atlanta Rhythm Section) are users of the mini-humbucker.
 Caleb Followill from Kings of Leon uses a Gibson ES 325 with mini-humbucker, which he only uses when playing live.
 Jeff Carlisi of 38 Special used a 1969 Gibson Les Paul with mini-humbuckers as his primary studio guitar.
 Neil Young is also a user of the mini-humbucker fitted in his “Old Black” guitar.
 Clarence Gatemouth Brown switched to the Gibson Firebird shortly after it was introduced in 1963 and used its mini-humbuckers and his finger-picking style to create a signature tone for his swing blues.
 As part of Motown's original, 3-guitar, Funk Brothers rhythm section, Eddie "Chank" Willis used a Gibson Firebird with mini-humbuckers to complement the tones of Robert White's Gibson L-5 and ES 335 and Joe Messina's modified Fender Telecaster.
 Paul Gilbert uses the PG-13 mini-humbucker pickups designed for him by DiMarzio, in his signature model Ibanez Fireman guitars.

References

Guitar pickups